USS San Bernardino (LST-1189) was the eleventh of twenty s of the United States Navy (USN) which replaced the traditional bow door-design tank landing ships (LSTs). The second USN ship to be named after the city in California, the ship was constructed by National Steel and Shipbuilding Company of San Diego, California. The LST was launched in 1970 and was commissioned in 1971. San Bernardino participated in the Vietnam War, earning one battle star and took part in operations in the Middle East. The ship was decommissioned 1995 and transferred to the Chilean Navy. In Chilean service, the vessel was renamed Valdivia (LST-93) for a battle during the Chilean War of Independence. The LST was recommissioned that year and during its service, took part in humanitarian efforts following earthquakes in Chile in 2010. In 2011 the Chilean Navy took Valdivia out of service due to repairs to the ship no longer being economical.

Design and description
However, the traditional bow door form for LSTs would not be capable. Therefore, the designers of the Newport class came up with a design of a traditional ship hull with a  aluminum ramp slung over the bow supported by two derrick arms. This made the Newport class the first to depart from the standard LST design that had been developed in early World War II.

San Bernardino was fitted with six Alco 16-645-ES diesel engines turning two shafts, three to each shaft. The ship was also equipped with a bow thruster to allow for better maneuvering near causeways and to hold position while offshore during the unloading of amphibious vehicles.

The Newport class were larger and faster than previous LSTs and were able to transport tanks, heavy vehicles and engineer groups and supplies that were too large for helicopters or smaller landing craft to carry. The LSTs have a ramp forward of the superstructure that connects the lower tank deck with the main deck and a passage large enough to allow access to the parking area amidships. The vessels are also equipped with a stern gate to allow the unloading of amphibious vehicles directly into the water or to unload onto a utility landing craft (LCU) or pier. At either end of the tank deck there is a  turntable that permits vehicles to turn around without having to reverse. The vessels also have davits for four vehicle and personnel landing craft (LCVPs) and could carry four pontoon causeway sections along the sides of the hull.

San Bernardino was initially armed with four Mark 33 /50 caliber guns in two twin turrets. The vessel was equipped with two Mk 63 gun control fire systems (GCFS) for the 3-inch guns, but these were removed in 1977–1978. The ship also had SPS-10 surface search radar. Atop the stern gate, the vessels mounted a helicopter deck. They had a maximum complement of 213 including 11 officers.

Construction and career

United States Navy service
The LST was ordered as the second hull of the third group in Fiscal Year 1967 and a contract was awarded on 15 July 1966. The ship's keel was laid down on 12 July 1969 by National Steel and Shipbuilding Company at their yard in San Diego, California. Named for a city in California, San Bernardino was launched on 28 March 1970, sponsored by the wife of Vice Admiral Walter H. Baumberger. The vessel was commissioned at the Long Beach Naval Shipyard on 27 March 1971 and assigned to Amphibious Squadron 3, Amphibious Force, Pacific Fleet and home ported in San Diego.

For the remainder of 1971, San Bernardino operated along the coast of California, conducting routine operations. In 1972 San Bernardino opened 1972 by escorting four Indonesian vessels from the United States to Pearl Harbor, Hawaii. The LST returned to San Diego, via Acapulco, Mexico on 9 February. From April until June, the ship trained off the Californian coast and in the Hawaiian Islands. On 7 June San Bernardino departed on a voyage to South America. The tank landing ship visited Valparaíso, Chile; Callao, Peru; and Rodman Naval Station, Panama, before returning to San Diego on 17 July. San Bernardino spent the next two months performing routine operations before being deployed to the western Pacific as part of the 7th Fleet. San Bernardino departed San Diego on 21 September and arrived in Subic Bay on 19 October. From there, the LST participated in ZAMEX 9–72 on 23–24 October and joined the Amphibious Ready Group (ARG) in the Gulf of Tonkin on 28 October, remaining with the unit until 14 November. The ARG was stationed off Da Nang, South Vietnam, in a constant state or readiness to respond to threats to Americans in the region. San Bernardino then sailed for Keelung, Taiwan and Subic Bay, rejoining the ARG in the Gulf of Tonkin on 15 December. The three ships arrived on 19 December after which San Bernardino was bound for Hong Kong for a short stay and returned to Subic Bay on 29 December and remained in port for the rest of the year. San Bernardinos deployment to the 7th Fleet continued until mid-April 1973. The ship returned to San Diego on 29 April. San Bernardino earned one battle star for service in the Vietnam War. San Bernardino continued routine operations along the Californian coast until mid June, remaining in port for five months. In early June, the LST was deployed to the western Pacific again, with stops at Pearl Harbor, Suva, Fiji, and Brisbane, Australia.

In 1990 San Bernardino was deployed to the Persian Gulf as part of Amphibious Ready Group Bravo (ARG Bravo) during the Gulf War. ARG Bravo was based at Okinawa, Japan. ARG Bravo was to deploy the Regimental Landing Team 4 headquarters and a combat service support detachment in an amphibious landing. However, this did not happen and after arrival in the operations area, the landing team were deployed as a rear area security force. The ships of ARG Bravo were instead used as sea-based mobile logistics platforms until their departure in November 1991. The ship was decommissioned on 30 September 1995 from the United States Navy.

Chilean Navy service

The ship was transferred to the Chilean Navy as part of the Security Assistance Program on 30 September at San Diego. The LST was renamed Valdivia (LST-93) for a battle during the Chilean War of Independence. The ship arrived at its new Chilean homeport, Valparaíso, on 1 December 1995. In Chilean service, the LST operated with the Amphibious and Naval Transport Command, performing operations from Arica to Puerto Williams. In mid-1997, Valdivia was damaged after going aground but repaired. During 2010, Valdivia was heavily involved in relief efforts following the series of earthquakes affecting Chile throughout 2010. The intense workload caused structural and component fatigue to the already old vessel, and an inspection in August 2010 concluded that repairing the ship would be uneconomical. Valdivia was decommissioned on 14 January 2011. The Chilean Navy planned to replace the LST with two landing platform dock type vessels.

See also
 
 List of United States Navy LSTs

Notes

Citations

References

External links

 
 

Newport-class tank landing ships
Ships built in San Diego
1970 ships
Cold War amphibious warfare vessels of the United States
San Bernardino, California
Ships transferred from the United States Navy to the Chilean Navy
Amphibious warfare vessels of the Chilean Navy